Gergely Gaal (born 3 June 1977) is a Hungarian educator and politician, member of the National Assembly (MP) from Fidesz–KDNP Pest County Regional List from 2013 to 2014 and from National List between 2017 and 2018.

Gaal joined Fidesz in 2004 and KDNP in 2006. He was elected deputy mayor of Solymár in the 2010 local elections. He became MP from the party's Pest County Regional List in March 2013, replacing László Salamon, who was appointed a member of the Constitutional Court of Hungary, as a result he resigned on 24 February 2013. Gaal was elected a member of the Committee of National Cohesion on 4 March 2013 and Committee on Youth, Social, Family and Housing Affairs on 10 June 2013.

He was elected MP again on 18 September 2017, replacing György Rubovszky, who died in office in June 2017. Gaal  was appointed Ministerial Commissioner within the Prime Minister's Office responsible for the coordination and promotion of settlement development programs at the local level and from domestic sources on 10 December 2020.

References

1977 births
Living people
Hungarian educators
Fidesz politicians
Christian Democratic People's Party (Hungary) politicians
Members of the National Assembly of Hungary (2010–2014)
Members of the National Assembly of Hungary (2014–2018)
Politicians from Budapest